Keani Reiner (1952–1994) was a Hawaiian surfer and sailor. Keani Reiner and her crewmate Penny Rawlins were the first women to sail on a long-open ocean voyage aboard Hōkūleʻa on the return trip from Tahiti to Hawai'i in 1976. She was also a part of the first all girl crew to complete the Na Holo Kai Sailing Canoe Race from Oahu to Kauai in 1990.

Early life 
She was born in Honolulu, Hawaii on March 20, 1952, of Blackfoot indian and German ancestry. Reiner completed her graduation from Punahou School. She was a member of the Outrigger Canoe Club. Keani sailed her own catamaran at the age of 7, which was built by her father.

Career 
In the 1970s she settled on the island of Kauai. In 1976, Keani Reiner and her crewmate Penny Rawlins were selected as the first two women to sail on Hokulea, a contemporary, traditionally designed, double hulled Polynesian sailing canoe, across the open ocean from Tahiti to Hawaii. She sailed along with other crew members including Snake Ah Hee, Andy Espirito, Kawika Kapahulehua, Mel Kinney, Kainoa Lee, Kimo Lyman, Gordon Piianaia, Leonard Puputauiki, Penny Rawlins, Nainoa Thompson, Makaala Yates and Dr. Ben Young.

In a personal communication, her crewmate Penny Martin said,

In 1990, Keani was a member of the first all-girl crew to complete the Na Holo Kai Sailing Canoe Race from Oahu to Kauai in 1990. She was also a certified captain. Keani Reiner is described as one of the pioneer women who showed the way and prepared the place for other women on board the traditional canoes of modern times.

Personal life 
Keani Reiner was married to John Kruse from 1980 until her divorce in 1988. She married Glenn Schot on June 2, 1990, in Hanalei, Kauai.

Death 
At the age of 42, she died of breast cancer on September 25, 1994. She was survived by her sister, Shea Reiner,husband Glenn Schot and her son Kepa Kruse.

See also 

 Hōkūleʻa
 List of surfers

References

Further reading

External links 
 A short summary of Keani Reiner's historic voyage aboard the Polynesian voyaging canoe Hokule'a in 1976.

1952 births
1994 deaths
American female surfers
American surfers
Female sailors
Sportspeople from Honolulu
American people of German descent
Native Hawaiian sportspeople
Punahou School alumni
20th-century American women
20th-century American people